Abdurrahman Gök (born 17 April 1980, Kuyubaşı, Batman) is a journalist and the author of the photographs which documented the murder of Kemal Kurkut.

Education 
He attended primary school in Kuyubaşı and received his secondary education in Batman. After he graduated from high school in 1997, he studied Arabic. Later he studied journalism at the Ege University in Izmir, and was employed by the Dicle News Agency in 2004.

Professional career 
He was prosecuted for his journalistic activities several times during his career. In 2009, while working for Dicle New Agency, he was arrested on the 24 March, after he reported on the Newroz festivities in Siirt. At the beginning he was accused of throwing stones at the police, then for being involved in the festivities and after all this was not viewed as credible, he was accused of being involved with the network of Roj TV a Kurdish television channel formerly based in Denmark, and was viewed as a being close to the Kurdistan Workers' Party (PKK) by the Turkish authorities. He was released in November 2009, pending trial. Between 2011 and 2012 he directed three documentaries.

He also covered the Newroz festivities at Diyarbakir in 2017, where he took a photograph of the moment when Kemal Kurkut was shot. He had to deliver a testimony at the prosecutors office and give the photographs of the killing of Kemal Kurkut to the prosecutor.

In October 2018, he was detained for three days and charged with being a member of a terrorist organization and the prosecution aims for a sentence between 7 and 20 years imprisonment. The indictment is based on the testimony of secret witness known as "Patience", a phone call with an unknown person over news of the Hawar News Agency, a speech he held at the Journalists day and further some text messages of an unknown person which asked him about photographs he took of refugees. The trial of Abdurrahman Gök began on the 23 February 2021 in Diyarbakır, where his ban to travel abroad was lifted and a private hearing for the secret witness was scheduled before the public hearings would begin again on the 3 June The secret witness testified from Gaziantep and alleged that both Kemal Kurkut and Abdurrahman Gök were members of the PKK, and the images of Kurkut's murder were taken of the PKKs orders. Gök said, "There is an attempt to take revenge on me 'on behalf of the state' for exposing the live bomb lie." In June 2022, he was sentenced to 1 and six months imprisonment for having made propaganda for a terrorist organization.

Award 

 For his photographs of Kemal Kurkut, he received a Metin Göktepe Journalism Award in 2017.
 For his photographs of Kemal Kurkut, he received the Musa Anter and Özgür Basın Şehitleri Journalism Award in 2017.
 He also received the Yılmaz Güney Honor Award in the category documentary at the 2nd Culture and Art Festival in 2012.
 First prize in Kurdish news in Successful Journalists of the Year Competition of the Southeastern Journalists Association in 2014

References 

Turkish journalists
Living people
1980 births
People from Kuyubaşı, Batman
Ege University alumni
Turkish photographers